Catherine Grenier is the Director of the Giacometti Foundation. She took that position in February 2014 following her tenure at the Centre Pompidou.
Grenier is credited with helping bridge the divide in Giacometti's legacy that formed following the death of his widow in 1993.

References

See also
w:fr:Catherine Grenier

Year of birth missing (living people)
Living people
French women curators
French art historians
French art critics
French women art critics
Women art historians
French women historians
French art curators